The 2021 Malaysia Cup Final was a football match played on 30 November 2021, and determined the champion of the 2021 Malaysia Cup. It was the final of the 95th edition of the Malaysia Cup, a competition organised by the Football Association of Malaysia.

It was played at the Bukit Jalil National Stadium in Kuala Lumpur between Kuala Lumpur City and Johor Darul Ta'zim.

Kuala Lumpur City won the match 2–0 and clinched their fourth title. They have also qualified for the 2022 AFC Cup.

Format
The final was played as a single match. If the game would be tied at the end of regulation time, extra time and, if necessary, a penalty shoot-out would be used to decide the winning team.

Road to the final

Note: In all results below, the score of the finalist is given first. (H: home; A: away)

Match

Statistics

References

Malaysia Cup knockout phase
Football cup competitions in Malaysia